Laiyang city is a county-level city within Yantai bordering Qingdao, located in the middle of the Shandong Peninsula, in Shandong province, China. The majority (70%) of its population are farmers and it is famous for producing the Laiyang pear. As of 2010, it had a population of 923,000.

Administrative divisions
As 2012, this city is divided to 4 subdistricts and 14 towns.
Subdistricts

Towns

Climate

Transport
 China National Highway 309
 Shandong Provincial Highway 209
 Shandong Provincial Highway 212
 Shandong Provincial Highway 804
 Lanyan Railway

References

External links
 
 
 

Cities in Shandong
Yantai